Marvell Wynne (born May 8, 1986) is an American former soccer player. He was a starting defender on the Colorado Rapids' 2010 MLS Cup Championship team and the 2008 United States Olympic soccer team, and made several appearances for the U.S. men's national team.

Personal
Born in Pittsburgh, Pennsylvania, Wynne is the son of former Major League Baseball player Marvell Wynne.

Career

High school and college
Wynne decided to pursue an athletic career of his own as early as the age of six, choosing soccer over his father's sport, baseball.  He attended Poway High School in Poway, California and was a letterman in soccer and track. Wynne in his senior year of high school ran the 100 meters dash in 11.05 seconds. Wynne played two years of college soccer at UCLA, where he was named first team All-American in 2005.

Professional

New York Red Bulls
Wynne was the first pick at the 2006 MLS SuperDraft, with the MetroStars (later renamed as New York Red Bulls) trading up to make the selection. He subsequently signed a Generation adidas contract with the league.

Known for his speed — he is considered one of the fastest players in the league — Wynne was initially considered too unpolished to play in the 3-5-2 system favored by then-coach Mo Johnston, but as Bruce Arena succeeded to the coaching position, Wynne began starting regularly in the first team's back line.

Toronto FC
Wynne was traded to Toronto FC in April 2007 in exchange for a partial allocation and a 2nd round pick in the 2008 MLS SuperDraft. In Toronto, Wynne he continued to impress, becoming a firm favorite amongst the fans. He scored his first career MLS goal in a game against Houston Dynamo on September 27, 2008.

Colorado Rapids
On March 25, 2010, Wynne was traded to Colorado Rapids in exchange for Nick LaBrocca and a 3rd round pick in the 2011 MLS SuperDraft. After a successful season with Colorado in which he converted from right back to center back, the team won MLS Cup 2010 – a game which took place at BMO Field in Toronto, Wynne's former home.

San Jose Earthquakes
Following the 2014 season, his fifth campaign in Colorado, the Rapids declined Wynne's 2015 contract option. In December 2014 he entered the 2014 MLS Re-Entry Draft and was selected in stage two by San Jose Earthquakes. Wynne was sidelined indefinitely from the 2017 season after the discovery of a heart abnormality during preseason. He underwent surgery for an enlarged aortic root, but was unable to secure medical clearance to return to the game, and officially announced his retirement as an active player on April 20, 2018.

International
Wynne has played for various youth United States national teams, and was part of the Under-20 team at the 2005 World Youth Championship. He earned his first senior cap for the United States in the 2007 Copa America against Argentina on June 28, 2007. Wynne was an integral part of the U-23 side that earned qualification to the Beijing Olympics, which also included, then Toronto FC teammate, Maurice Edu.

Wynne also was a starter on the U.S. Men's 2008 Olympic soccer team. Wynne received his second cap for the senior team on January 24, 2009, against Sweden, drawing a penalty that Sacha Kljestan converted.

After retirement 
After retirement, Wynne moved to Quincy, Illinois, where he served as the assistant coach of the men's soccer team at John Wood Community College until 2021. He studied yoga, personal training and nutrition.

Career statistics

Honors

Toronto FC
Canadian Championship (1): 2009

Colorado Rapids
Major League Soccer Eastern Conference Championship (1): 2010
Major League Soccer MLS Cup (1): 2010

References

External links
 
 
 

1986 births
Living people
2007 Copa América players
2009 FIFA Confederations Cup players
African-American soccer players
American soccer players
American expatriate sportspeople in Canada
American expatriate soccer players
Expatriate soccer players in Canada
Association football defenders
UCLA Bruins men's soccer players
New York Red Bulls players
Toronto FC players
Colorado Rapids players
San Jose Earthquakes players
Soccer players from Pittsburgh
Footballers at the 2008 Summer Olympics
New York Red Bulls draft picks
Major League Soccer first-overall draft picks
Major League Soccer players
Olympic soccer players of the United States
People from Poway, California
Soccer players from California
United States men's under-20 international soccer players
United States men's under-23 international soccer players
United States men's international soccer players
All-American men's college soccer players